Michal Krištof (born October 11, 1993) is a Slovak professional ice hockey center playing for Admiral Vladivostok of the Kontinental Hockey League (KHL).

Krištof made his Liiga debut with Vaasan Sport during the 2014–15 season, playing two games for the team. He also played in the Slovak Extraliga for HK Nitra and the Czech Extraliga with HC Kometa Brno.

Playing career

Early years
About four years old, Michal Krištof first stepped on the ice when his parents took him to an ice rink near his home in Nitra in Slovakia. He later started playing and practicing together with his three-year older cousin. Kristof played minor hockey in the local club HK Nitra.

Krištof's childhood idol was Steve Yzerman, "I do not really know why exactly him. I liked his playing style and took example of him".

Junior
As a 17-year-old, Krištof received a phone call from his agent about an opportunity to go to Vaasa, Finland where Sport's junior A team held a ten-day-long tryout camp during the summer. The young Slovak convinced the coaches and was added to the team's roster. During his first season in the junior's SM-liiga (2011–2012), Krištof scored 37 points over 42 games. During the 2012–2013 season, Krištof was among the top three points scorers for a long time but ended up in sixth place after being injured.

Professional
The 2013–14 season was Krištof's first on the senior level, playing for Sport in Mestis. Krištof had a good start to the season, but coach Pasi Räsänen eventually moved him to the junior A team after 37 games.

After Jokerit's decision to move to the KHL for the 2014–2015 season, Sport was added to the SM-liiga. Krištof signed a one-year-long contract with the now SM-liiga team. After starting the season on a loan to Peliitat in Mestis, where he scored three goals and made eight assists in six games, Krištof was called back to Sport. On October 3, 2014, Michal Krištof made his debut in the SM-liiga in a 3–2 away loss against Pelicans, where Krištof played right wing alongside centre Lassi Kokkala and left wing Teemu Henritius. Krištof recorded 11 minutes and 43 seconds of time on the ice, had one shot on goal, a zero plus-minus and zero penalty minutes in his first SM-liiga game.

Krištof spent the 2021–22 season in the Czech Extraliga with HC Kometa Brno, leaving as a free agent at the conclusion of his contract to sign a one-year contract in the KHL with Russian club, Admiral Vladivostok, on July 21, 2022.

Career statistics

Regular season and playoffs
Bold indicates led league

International

Awards and honours

Criticizm
Krištof is one of very few European players that signed contract with KHL team after start of Russian invasion and genocide in Ukraine in February 2022.
As a player of Admiral Vladivostok he takes part in propaganda activities to support Russian army and its aggression in Ukraine, such as wearing army jersey in the match the day before first anniversary of Russian invasion in Ukraine.

References

External links
 

1993 births
Living people
Admiral Vladivostok players
Hokki players
Ice hockey players at the 2018 Winter Olympics
Ice hockey players at the 2022 Winter Olympics
HK Nitra players
Olympic ice hockey players of Slovakia
Medalists at the 2022 Winter Olympics
Olympic bronze medalists for Slovakia
Olympic medalists in ice hockey
Oulun Kärpät players
Peliitat Heinola players
Slovak ice hockey centres
Sportspeople from Nitra
Vaasan Sport players
HC Kometa Brno players
Slovak expatriate ice hockey players in the Czech Republic
Slovak expatriate ice hockey players in Finland
Slovak expatriate ice hockey players in Russia